Marzano Appio is a comune (municipality) in the Province of Caserta in the Italian region Campania, located about  northwest of Naples and about  northwest of Caserta.

Marzano Appio borders the following municipalities: Caianello, Conca della Campania, Presenzano, Roccamonfina, Tora e Piccilli, Vairano Patenora.

References

Cities and towns in Campania